The Quiet Gun is a 1957 American Western film directed by William F. Claxton and written by Eric Norden and Earle Lyon. The film stars Forrest Tucker, Mara Corday, Jim Davis and Kathleen Crowley. It is based on the 1955 novel Lawman by Lauran Paine.

It was also known as 'Fury at Rock River'.

Plot
Doug Sadler (Lee Van Cleef), a cattle rustler comes to town. He's in a secret partnership with saloon owner John Reilly (Tom Brown). They plan to run the stolen cattle into Hell's Canyon, located on land belonging to Ralph Carpenter (Jim Davis). Carpenter and his wife Teresa (Kathleen Crowley) are separated, so Reilly has sent Native American beauty Irene (Mara Corday) to seduce Carpenter. Then Reilly put a flea in the ear of Steven Hardy (Lewis Martin), the town's Eastern born city attorney about "immorality". When Hardy tries to serve a warrant for his arrest, in the resulting confrontation Hardy is killed. Sheriff Brandon (Forrest Tucker), who was in love with Teresa before her marriage and was friends with Ralph Carpenter, sets out to arrest Carpenter. However, a lynch mob knocks out the sheriff and hangs Carpenter. Brandon arrests the mob and tricks the city council into stopping another mob that demands the release of the arrested men. Meanwhile, Irene returns to the Carpenter house where she is discovered by Reilly and Sadler, who assault her. At the trial the members of the lynch mob are sentenced to three years in jail. Then Mrs. Carpenter arrives with the news that Reilly and Sadler have killed Irene. In a gunfight Sadler and Reilly are killed. Sheriff Brandon is only wounded and reunited with Teresa.

Cast
 Forrest Tucker as Sheriff Carl Brandon
 Mara Corday as Irene
 Jim Davis as Ralph Carpenter
 Kathleen Crowley as Tersa Carpenter
 Lee Van Cleef as Doug Sadler
 Hank Worden as Sampson
 Tom Brown as John Reilly
 Gerald Milton as Lesser
 Lewis Martin as Steven Hardy
 Vince Barnett as Undertaker
 Edith Evanson as Mrs. Merrick

Production
The film was an early movie from Regal Films who made B movies for 20th Century Fox. It was from the same team who had made Stagecoach to Fury (1956).

Reception
During a screening of the film in Los Angeles, an armed robber burgled the cinema and was shot by police trying to flee.

See also
 List of American films of 1957

References

External links
 
 
 

1957 films
1950s English-language films
Films based on American novels
Films based on Western (genre) novels
20th Century Fox films
American Western (genre) films
1957 Western (genre) films
Films scored by Paul Dunlap
Films directed by William F. Claxton
1950s American films